Soni Luke (born 25 February 1996) is a Tonga international rugby league footballer who plays as a  for the Penrith Panthers in the NRL.

Background
Luke played his junior rugby league for the St Mary's Saints. He is of Tongan descent.

Playing career
In round 7 of the 2022 NRL season, Luke made his first grade debut for the Penrith Panthers against the Canberra Raiders at Penrith Stadium.
Luke spent the majority of the season playing for Penrith's NSW Cup team. On 25 September 2022, Luke played for Penrith in their NSW Cup Grand Final victory over Canterbury scoring a try in the second half.
On 2 October, Luke played in Penrith's 44-10 victory over Norths Devils in the NRL State Championship final.  Luke was sent to the sin bin during the second half of the match for a professional foul.

References

External links
Penrith Panthers profile

1996 births
Living people
Australian sportspeople of Tongan descent
Australian rugby league players
Penrith Panthers players
Rugby league hookers
Rugby league players from Penrith, New South Wales
Tonga national rugby league team players